The version history of Safari spans from 2003 to the present (2023), from its initial preview release for macOS to Safari 16, first released in 2022.

Version compatibility

Release history

Mac

Safari 1

Safari 2

Safari 3

Safari 4

Safari 5

Safari 6

Safari 7

Safari 8

Safari 9

Safari 10

Safari 11

Safari 12

Safari 13

Safari 14

Safari 15

Safari 16

iOS/iPadOS

Safari 3

Safari 4

Safari 5

Safari 6

Safari 7

Safari 8

Safari 9

Safari 10

Safari 11

Safari 12

Safari 13

Safari 14

Safari 15

Safari 16

Windows 
A few early versions of Safari between 3.0 and 5.1 were released for Windows. Safari 6.0 and on are only available on macOS or iOS / iPadOS.

Safari 3

Safari 4

Safari 5

See also 
 Chrome version history
 Firefox version history
 Safari (web browser)
 iOS version history
 iTunes version history

References

External links
 – official site at Apple

Apple Inc. software
Software version histories